Eucalyptus nobilis, commonly known as ribbon gum or giant white gum, is a species of medium to tall tree that is native to northern New South Wales and south-east Queensland. It has a long, straight trunk with smooth, greyish bark that is shed in long ribbons, lance-shaped or curved adult leaves, flower buds in groups of seven, white flowers and cup-shaped or hemispherical fruit.

Description
It has smooth, white and pale grey bark that is shed in long ribbons. Flowering mainly occurs from February to May and the flowers are white.

Taxonomy and naming
Eucalyptus nobilis was first formally described in 1990 by Lawrie Johnson and Ken Hill in the journal Telopea, from specimens collected by Johnson near Nowendoc in 1984. The specific epithet (nobilis) is a Latin word meaning "noble" or "excellent", referring to the tall, straight habit of this eucalypt.

Distribution and habitat
Ribbon gum grows in tall forests on deep, fertile soils on the ranges from the southern Darling Downs in Queensland, extending south to the ranges of the Northern Tablelands and Liverpool Range.

References

nobilis
Myrtales of Australia
Flora of New South Wales
Trees of Australia
Plants described in 1990
Taxa named by Lawrence Alexander Sidney Johnson
Taxa named by Ken Hill (botanist)